Joseph Lafontaine (April 4, 1885 – December 14, 1965) was a merchant and political figure in Quebec. He represented Mégantic—Frontenac and then Mégantic in the House of Commons of Canada as a Liberal member from 1940 to 1958.

He was born in St-Calixte de Somerset, Quebec, the son of Grégoire Lafontaine and Aurélie Tourigny, and was educated in Arthabaska. In 1906, he married Marie-Louise Boisvert. Lafontaine was an unsuccessful candidate for a seat in the Quebec assembly in 1935. He lived in Thetford Mines.

References
 
 Canadian Parliamentary Guide, 1957, PJ Normandin

1885 births
1965 deaths
Members of the House of Commons of Canada from Quebec
Liberal Party of Canada MPs